The seventh Sarawak state election was held between Saturday, 7 September and Sunday, 8 September 1996 with nomination date on Tuesday, 27 August 1996. The Sarawak State Assembly was dissolved on 15 August 1996 before its expiration on 28 November 1996. There were 62 seats available but only 43 were contested on the election day. This election saw 814,347 registered voters with 64.18% voters turned up to cast their votes.

Sarawak Barisan Nasional (BN) which was consisting of Sarawak United Peoples' Party (SUPP), Sarawak National Party (SNAP), Parti Pesaka Bumiputera Bersatu (PBB), and Sarawak Dayak People's Party (PBDS) fielded candidates for all 62 seats, followed by Democratic Action Party (DAP) fielding 6 candidates, while there were 60 independents jostling for 38 state seats in Sarawak. A total of 128 candidates was successfully nominated on the nomination day. PBDS which was an opposition party back in 1991 election, was re-accepted into Sarawak BN in 1994.

Results

Summary

Results by constituency
There were 19 seats won uncontested by Sarawak BN on the nomination day. On the polling day, Sarawak BN won 38 out of 43 seats contested, thus made up to a total of 57 seats. DAP had made the first breakthrough by winning 3 seats as compared to previous state elections where the party returned empty handed. The remaining two seats were won by independents. Wong Soon Kai, the then deputy chief minister of Sarawak was defeated by Wong Ho Leng from DAP in the state constituency of Bukit Assek.

A total of 5 election petitions was filed to the Sarawak high court after the election:

Petition for N08 Padungan was filed by an independent candidate
Petition for N22 Bukit Begunan was filed by an independent candidate
Petition for N45 Balingian was filed by an independent candidate
Petition for N52 Kemena was filed by DAP
Petition for N53 Kidurong was filed by BN

The list of elected representatives is listed below:

Notes

References 

1996
1996 Sarawak state election